Sharyland Pioneer High School is a public high school located in unincorporated Hidalgo County, Texas, near Mission. It is part of the Sharyland Independent School District. In 2015, the school was rated "Met Standard" by the Texas Education Agency. The first graduating class from Pioneer high school was in 2015 with roughly about 150 seniors since most decided to finish their senior year at Sharyland high school. The first full four year graduating class, that spent all their four years at Pioneer, was the class of 2018.

The school serves sections of Mission, McAllen, Palmhurst, and Alton.

Athletics
The Sharyland Pioneer Diamondbacks compete in the following sports:

Baseball
Basketball
Cross Country
Football
Golf
Powerlifting
Soccer
Softball
Swimming and Diving
Tennis
Track and Field
Volleyball
Wrestling
 *Cheerleading team became the 2018 UIL 5A-DivisionII State Champions. First team Championship at Pioneer High School. Took only 4 years for a team to bring a State Championship to Pioneer High School

References

External links 
 

Mission, Texas
Sharyland Independent School District high schools